William Henry Myers (30 November 1854 – 21 December 1933) was an English  Conservative politician who sat in the House of Commons from 1892 to 1906.

Myers was elected Member of Parliament for Winchester in 1892. He held the seat until 1906.

Myers died at the age of 79.

References

External links

Conservative Party (UK) MPs for English constituencies
UK MPs 1892–1895
UK MPs 1895–1900
UK MPs 1900–1906
1933 deaths
1854 births